Cheiracanthium occidentale is a spider species found in Menorca.

See also 
 List of Eutichuridae species

References

External links 

occidentale
Spiders of Europe
Environment of Menorca
Spiders described in 1882